Peter Kerr (21 April 182031 March 1912) was an Australian architect and the principal designer of the Parliament House of Victoria, Australia, commencing from a government architect's basic design.

Kerr immigrated to Melbourne in 1852 after working under Sir Charles Barry on the design of the Palace of Westminster. Having also associated with Augustus Pugin, he was well versed in the Gothic Revival style in which, over 40 years, he developed one of the city's great buildings.

See also
Knight & Kerr

References

1820 births
1912 deaths
Architects from Melbourne
19th-century Australian architects